Manuel v. Joliet, 580 U.S. ___ (2017), was a case in which the United States Supreme Court held that a criminal defendant may bring a claim under the Fourth Amendment of the United States Constitution to challenge pretrial confinement. In a 6-2 majority opinion written by Justice Elena Kagan, the Court stated that "the Fourth Amendment governs a claim for unlawful pretrial detention even beyond the start of legal process". This decision reversed and remanded the judgment of the Seventh Circuit Court of Appeals. Justice Clarence Thomas wrote a dissenting opinion. Justice Thomas also joined a dissenting opinion by Justice Samuel Alito.

See also
 List of United States Supreme Court cases
 Lists of United States Supreme Court cases by volume
 List of United States Supreme Court cases by the Roberts Court

References

External links
 

United States Fourth Amendment case law
United States Supreme Court cases
United States Supreme Court cases of the Roberts Court
2017 in United States case law